Ludomir Sleńdziński (29 October 1889 – 26 November 1980) was a Polish painter. His work was part of the painting event in the art competition at the 1928 Summer Olympics.

References

1889 births
1980 deaths
20th-century Polish painters
20th-century Polish male artists
Olympic competitors in art competitions
Artists from Vilnius
Polish male painters